Leeds was an electoral district of the Legislative Assembly of the Parliament of the Province of Canada, in the eastern area of Canada West (now Ontario). Leeds was created in 1841, upon the establishment of the Province of Canada by the union of Upper Canada and Lower Canada.  It was based on Leeds County, located on the north shore of the Saint Lawrence River.

Leeds was represented by one member in the Legislative Assembly.  It was abolished in 1867, upon the creation of Canada and the province of Ontario.

Boundaries 

Leeds electoral district was based on Leeds County (now included in the United Counties of Leeds and Grenville).  It was located in the eastern area of Canada West, on the north shore of the Saint Lawrence River.  Brockville was the major centre for the riding, although it was a separate electoral district.

The Union Act, 1840 had merged the two provinces of Upper Canada and Lower Canada into the Province of Canada, with a single Parliament.  The separate parliaments of Lower Canada and Upper Canada were abolished.Union Act, 1840, 3 & 4 Vict. (UK), c. 35, s. 2.  The Union Act provided that the pre-existing electoral boundaries of Upper Canada would continue to be used in the new Parliament, unless altered by the Union Act itself.

Leeds County had been an electoral district in the Legislative Assembly of Upper Canada.  The general outline of the boundaries were not altered by the Act. The boundaries had originally been set by a proclamation of the first Lieutenant Governor of Upper Canada, John Graves Simcoe, in 1792:

The boundaries had been further defined by a statute of Upper Canada in 1798:

Since Leeds was not changed by the Union Act, those boundaries continued to be used for the new electoral district, with one significant change: the Union Act provided that the town of Brockville would be a separate electoral district. Brockville therefore ceased to be included in Leeds electoral district.

Members of the Legislative Assembly 

Leeds was represented by one member in the Legislative Assembly. The following were the members for Leeds.

Abolition 

The electoral district was abolished on July 1, 1867, when the British North America Act, 1867 came into force, creating Canada and splitting the Province of Canada into Quebec and Ontario.  It was succeeded by electoral districts Leeds North and Grenville North, and Leeds South, in both the House of Commons of Canada and the Legislative Assembly of Ontario.

References 

.

Electoral districts of Canada West